Aristarchus was the name of at least two people of classical antiquity known to be physicians:
 Aristarchus, a Greek physician, of whom no particulars are known, except that he was attached to the court of Berenice, the wife of Antiochus II Theos, king of Syria, around 261-246 BC, and persuaded her to entrust herself to the hands of her enemy Laodice I after Antiochus's death. This unfortunately ended in the execution of Berenice and her infant son.
 Aristarchus, another physician of obscure history, whose medical prescriptions are quoted by later and more renowned writers such as Galen and Sicamus Aëtius. He appears to have been a native of Tarsus in Cilicia.

References

3rd-century BC Greek physicians